Tiberio Carafa (died 1588) was a Roman Catholic prelate who served as Bishop of Cassano all'Jonio (1579–1588) and Bishop of Potenza (1566–1579).

Biography
On 15 May 1566, Tiberio Carafa  was appointed during the papacy of Pope Pius V as Bishop of Potenza. On 26 May 1566, he was consecrated bishop by Scipione Rebiba, Cardinal-Priest of Sant'Anastasia, with Giulio Antonio Santorio, Archbishop of Santa Severina, and Vincenzo Lauro, Bishop of Mondovi, serving as co-consecrators. On 6 Feb 1579, he was appointed during the papacy of Pope Gregory XIII as Bishop of Cassano all'Jonio. He served as Bishop of Cassano all'Jonio until his death in 1588.

See also
Catholic Church in Italy

References

External links and additional sources
 (for Chronology of Bishops) 
 (for Chronology of Bishops)  
 (for Chronology of Bishops) 
 (for Chronology of Bishops)  

16th-century Italian Roman Catholic bishops
Bishops appointed by Pope Pius V
Bishops appointed by Pope Gregory XIII
1588 deaths